A non-Archimedean time theory of time is any theory that holds that there exist instants infinitely in the future or infinitely in the past. It is so called because, if the instants of such time are assigned numbers, the set of such numbers must be non-Archimedean.

Non-Archimedean future time would entail the existence of a future moment T, such that for any finite duration y there exists a moment Now + y but less than T. Note that if such a future moment T existed, there would exist an infinity of moments such that for all finite moments y' , T − y'  would be after every moment Now + y where y is a finite duration. Likewise, one may conceive of a non-archimedean past.

One may distinguish singularly, multiply and infinitely non-Archimedean times. In a singularly non-archimedean time, we can choose (albeit arbitrarily) a single moment T infinitely in the future (and/or the past, mutatis mutandis), such that every other moment infinitely in the future (past) is finitely in the future or past of T. In a multiply non-Archimedean time, there exists a finite set of moments S (where the cardinality of S is greater than two) such that each member of S, T, is infinitely in the future or past of every other element of S, and there exists an infinity of moments finitely in the future of T, and every instant that is not an element of S is finitely in the future or past of one element of S, and infinitely in the future or past of every other element of S. Finally, for an infinitely non-archimedean time there is no such finite set S, but there is an infinite set S, mutatis mutandis.

Metaphysical theories
Philosophy of time